The High Commissioner from New Zealand to Tonga is New Zealand's foremost diplomatic representative in the Kingdom of Tonga, and in charge of New Zealand's diplomatic mission in Tonga.

The High Commission is located in Nukualofa, Tonga's capital city.  New Zealand has maintained a resident High Commissioner in Tonga since 1976.

As fellow members of the Commonwealth of Nations, diplomatic relations between New Zealand and Tonga are at governmental level, rather than between Heads of State.  Thus, the countries exchange High Commissioners, rather than ambassadors.

List of heads of mission

High Commissioners to Tonga

Non-resident High Commissioners to Tonga, resident in Samoa
 Richard Taylor (1970–1971)
 Gray Thorp (1971–1975)
 Paul Cotton (1975–1976)

Resident High Commissioners to Tonga
 Don Hunn (1976–1979)
 Rod Gates (1979–1981)
 John Brady (1981–1983)
 Priscilla Williams (1983–1985)
 Graeme Ammundsen (1985–1988)
 John Carter (1988–1991)
 Nigel Moore (1991–1995)
 Ian Hill (1995–1998)
 Brian Smythe (1999–2001)
 Warwick Hawker (2001–2004)
 Michael McBryde (2004–2008)
 Christine Bogle (2008-2010)
 Jonathan Austin (2010-2012)
 Mark Talbot (2012-2015)
 Sarah Walsh (2015-2018)
 Tiffany Babington (2018-)

References
 Heads of Missions List: T.  New Zealand Ministry of Foreign Affairs and Trade.  Retrieved on 2006-07-08.
 New Zealand names new High Commissioner to Tonga 2008

Tonga, High Commissioners from New Zealand to
 
New Zealand